Arnab Das Sharma (born 20 December 1987) is an Indian football player.

Career

Youth
Sharma stepped into club level football at the age of 13, joining Kalighat Club in Kolkata after successfully giving a trial there. He continued to play for the team until he was selected to play for the youth team at Rajasthan Football Club, Kolkata.

Professional

George Telegraph SC
After a successful youth career, Sharma was picked up by George Telegraph SC, one of Kolkata's major football teams and continued to play for the team in the Calcutta Football League.

Air India
GoalKeeper coach Somen SinghaChowdhury sent this immensely talented player to  Air India FC coach Bimal Ghosh. Signing for the Mumbai-based club was Sharma's debut in the I-League, India's highest football league.

Kingfisher East Bengal
In the year 2008, having had a series of brilliant displays in goal, Kolkata giants East Bengal FC approached the youngster and he finally signed for the team. This season was not one to remember for Sharma, having fallen to 2nd choice to India no. 1 Subrata Paul.

Back to Air India
The following year, hearing of the keepers availability, Air India FC wasted no time in signing Sharma (on loan), making it his second-stint with the team. Regaining his starting place in the I-League, Air India performed well and Sharma was said to have single-handed rescued the team on numerous occasions.

Salgaocar SC
Observing his fantastic display, Salgaocar SC did not think twice before bringing the Bengali lad to Goa from Air India. The green outfit were said to have the best keeper combination in the league with Karanjit Singh and Arnab Das Sharma in the same team. 
In a match against former club East Bengal, an error by Sharma which allowed East Bengal's Australian striker Tolgay Ozbey to score led to an argument between him and Salgaocar's Moroccan coach Karim Bencherifa.

United Sikkim FC
After having a disastrous year in Goa, sharma had offers from a few I-League and a few Kolkata-based clubs but he opted to join I-League 2nd Division outfit United Sikkim FC, the team owned by iconic footballer Baichung Bhutia and sponsored by Bollywood playback singer Shankar Mahadevan and Dubai-based company Fidelis World.

Mohammedan Sporting Club
In January 2012 he signed to Mohammedan Sporting Club from Kolkata for 2nd Division I-league.

Mohun Bagan Athletics Club
In June 2015, he signed to Mohun Bagan Athletics Club from Kolkata for 1st Division I-league.

References

External links
 http://www.indianfootball.com/en/statistic/player/detail/playerId/83
 http://goal.com/en-india/people/india/21097/arnab-das-sharma

Indian footballers
1987 births
Living people
I-League players
United Sikkim F.C. players
People from Howrah district
Footballers from West Bengal
Association football goalkeepers
Mohun Bagan AC players
East Bengal Club players
Calcutta Football League players
Air India FC players
Salgaocar FC players
Mohammedan SC (Kolkata) players
Mumbai Tigers FC players
Indian Super League players
ATK (football club) players
Mumbai City FC players
RoundGlass Punjab FC players
Odisha FC players
Gokulam Kerala FC players